Logan Stieber (born January 24, 1991) is an American former freestyle and folkstyle wrestler, who competed internationally at 61 and 65 kilograms. In the Olympic year of 2016, he won the non-Olympic world championship at 61kg, and in 2018, he won a Pan American title.

In folkstyle, Stieber is one of the most accomplished collegiate wrestlers in the history of the NCAA, having won four NCAA Division I national championships, four Big Ten Conference championships, and the Dan Hodge Trophy for the Ohio State Buckeyes during his career.

Education and career
Stieber went to Monroeville High School, in Monroeville, Ohio, and won five Ohio High School Athletic Association (OHSAA) state wrestling championships (four individually, and a team title for Monroeville in 2010), losing only once his entire high school career, to David Taylor of St. Paris Graham. Stieber finished his Monroeville career with a record of 184-1, and his 179 straight wins is still an OHSAA record as of 2016.

Stieber later committed to Ohio State University, where he became one of the most decorated wrestlers in NCAA history.

Already a four-time Big Ten Champion, on March 21, 2015, Stieber became only the fourth wrestler in NCAA history to win four individual National Championships. He also led the Ohio State Buckeyes to their first team National Championship for wrestling in school history.

Stieber finished his NCAA career with a record of 119-3.

Following college, Stieber went on record as stating he would be training in hopes of joining Team USA for the 2016 Summer Olympics. Steiber would later represent Team USA on its 2017 World Team. Stieber retired in April 2019 and will be coaching at the Ohio RTC Center.

Championships and accomplishments

High school
Four-time OHSAA Division III State Wrestling Champion 
2007, 2008, 2009, 2010: individual
2010: team (as a member of the Monroeville Eagles)
2008: FILA Junior National Champion
2010: Junior Dan Hodge Trophy winner

College
Four-time Big Ten Champion
2012, 2013, 2014, 2015: individual
2015: team (as a member of the Ohio State Buckeyes)
Four-time NCAA Division I National Champion:
2012, 2013, 2014, 2015: individual
2015: team (as a member of the Ohio State Buckeyes)
2012: Big Ten Freshman of the Year (wrestling)
2015: Dan Hodge Trophy winner
2015: NCAA Most Dominant Wrestler
2015: National Wrestling Coaches Association (NWCA) Most Outstanding Wrestler

International - Freestyle 
 2016: World Champion
 2018: World Cup Champion
 2018: Pan American Champion

See also

 List of Ohio State University people

References

1991 births
Living people
American male sport wrestlers
Ohio State Buckeyes wrestlers
People from Monroeville, Ohio
Sportspeople from Ohio
World Wrestling Champions
Big Ten Athlete of the Year winners
Pan American Wrestling Championships medalists